Founder or Founders may refer to:

Places
Founders Park, a stadium in South Carolina, formerly known as Carolina Stadium
 Founders Park, a waterside park in Islamorada, Florida

Arts, entertainment, and media
 Founders (Star Trek), the alien leaders of the fictional state and military superpower, the Dominion, in Star Trek
 The Founder (newspaper), the student newspaper at Royal Holloway, University of London
 The Founder, a 2016 biographical feature film about McDonald's pioneer Ray Kroc

Companies and organizations
 Founder Group, a Chinese information technology and pharmaceutical conglomerate
 Founder Technology, a Shanghai subsidiary
 Founders Brewing Company, a craft brewery located in Grand Rapids, Michigan, United States
 Founders Ministries, Christian group in the United States
 Worshipful Company of Founders, a livery company based in London, England, United Kingdom

Roles
 Organizational founder, the person or group of persons responsible for creating an entity
 Founder, in entrepreneurship, the starter of a private or public company
 Philanthropist, the starter of a charity
 Founder, a metallurgist who operates a foundry
 Founding Fathers - see list of national founders

Science and healthcare
 Founder, a hoof ailment caused by laminitis
 Founder effect, genetic effect of expansion of isolated small populations

Other uses
 Founder (IRC), management status for Internet Relay Chat
 To founder (or foundering), a nautical term for shipwrecking

See also
 Foundered strata, rock beds which have collapsed due to removal of underlying beds
 List of founders of English schools and colleges